Barrett Hankins Baber (born May 18, 1980) is an American country musician, where he plays alternative country and country rock music, and who was a contestant on NBC's The Voice, where he auditioned and got a four chair turn during season nine, and he chose to be a member of team Blake Shelton. His songs have charted on the Billboard magazine charts, during his performances on the show.  He finished the competition in third place behind winner Jordan Smith and runner-up Emily Ann Roberts.

Early and personal life
Baber was born, Barrett Hankins Baber, on May 18, 1980, in Arkansas, who considers Marion, Arkansas, his hometown. He is a survivor of American Airlines Flight 1420, which crashed upon landing at Little Rock National Airport on June 1, 1999.

Music career

Early music career
His music career started in 2004, with his release, Fratbar Superstar, that was released on December 14, 2004. He release the subsequent album, Colt Square Sessions, on April 13, 2012. The third album, Battlefield Us, was released on September 14, 2013. His first extended play, Falling Again, was released on May 8, 2015.

2015: The Voice
He appeared on  season nine of NBC's The Voice, in the fall of 2015, with this appearance he got a four chair turn during the auditions, when he chose to be part of Blake Shelton's team on the show. His renditions of "Angel Eyes", "I Drive Your Truck", "Right Here Waiting", "Delta Dawn", and "I'd Love to Lay You Down", all have charted on the Billboard magazine Country Digital Songs charts, where they peaked at Nos. 41, 27, 9, 20, and 1, correspondingly. The songs, "Right Here Waiting", "Delta Dawn", and "I'd Love to Lay You Down", charted on the Billboard Hot Country Songs chart, at Nos. 36, 47, and 16, respectively. The song, "I'd Love to Lay You Down", charted on the Billboard Hot 100 at No. 92, while it also peaked at No. 10 on the Billboard Digital Songs chart.

 – Studio version of performance reached the top 10 on iTunes

2016: New music 
On February 13, 2016, Baber released a new single, "Kiss Me Hello," co-written with Kenny Lamb. Baber released his newest album "A Room Full of Fighters" on November 4, 2016. Within the first day of the album's release, it topped the ITunes Charts at top 20.

Discography

Albums

Singles

References

External links
 Official website
 The Voice artist profile

1980 births
Living people
American country rock singers
American country singer-songwriters
American male singer-songwriters
Republic Records artists
Singer-songwriters from Arkansas
People from Marion, Arkansas
The Voice (franchise) contestants
Country musicians from Arkansas
21st-century American male singers
21st-century American singers